Frederick Jones (9 December 1942 – 20 March 2021) was an Australian rugby league footballer who played in the 1960s and 1970s. An Australian international and New South Wales interstate representative , he played his club football for Manly-Warringah, with whom he won the 1972 and 1973 NSWRFL Premierships.

Playing career
A product of the South Coast, Jones rose through the Manly juniors, appearing in the New South Wales Rugby Football League premiership's first grade in 1961. 

Except for the 1964 season that he spent at Tumbarumba, Jones played his entire career with the Manly-Warringah club, fourteen seasons in all, and also captained the club. A , he first gained representative honors in 1968, playing for New South Wales and then Australia in the World Cup, and ended the year with Manly's grand final loss to Souths. 

In 1970, Jones suffered another grand final defeat before captaining the club to their first premiership title. He was a try scorer in the club's 19–14 grand final win over Easts in 1972 and was named in Australia's World Cup squad that went to France at the end of the year. After a four-year absence, Jones played in all three interstate matches in 1973 and finished a memorable year by leading Manly to victory over Cronulla in the grand final. His final season with Manly was in 1975. He retired with the club's all-time record for most first-grade games.

References

1942 births
2021 deaths
Australian rugby league players
Manly Warringah Sea Eagles players
Manly Warringah Sea Eagles captains
New South Wales rugby league team players
City New South Wales rugby league team players
Australia national rugby league team players
Rugby league hookers